Self Made Vol. 1 is a compilation album by MMG. The album was released on May 24, 2011, by Maybach Music Group and Warner Bros. Records. It features MMG's new roster additions, Wale, Meek Mill, Teedra Moses, Pill and Stalley along with Torch and Gunplay of Triple C's. Outside of the label, the album features guest appearances from Curren$y, Jadakiss, Jeremih, J. Cole, CyHi the Prynce and French Montana.

"Play Your Part" was previously released on Rick Ross' 2010 mixtape, Ashes to Ashes, while "Pandemonium" was also previously released along with a music video.  The album was planned to be released on May 24, 2011, but got pushed up one day to May 23, 2011. The album sold 58,900 copies in its first week, debuting at number 5 on the US Billboard 200 and number 1 on the Top Rap Albums and Top R&B/Hip Hop Albums charts. As of November 25, 2011, the album has sold 183,000 copies in the United States.

Background 
In an early March interview with Rap Radar, Rick Ross was asked if there were any plans of releasing a Maybach Music compilation album to introduce his new label-mates.  Ross responded to the question stating:
"I think we will bypass the compilation aspect but we’re gonna be releasing mixtapes. I was on the phone with DJ Drama last night discussing the possibility of a Maybach music, Gangsta Grillz. Like what we could do to make it different, you know. We had a good conversation."
However, a few hours after the interview was posted to the internet, Rick Ross seemed to have a change of heart.  He soon announced that he and Maybach Music Group will be releasing their first compilation album, Self Made, and will be distributed through his new deal with Warner Bros. Production of the album is handled by Cardiak, Just Blaze, Lex Luger, Lee Major, and many more.  On April 18 the official track listing was revealed.

Singles
Prior to the release of Self Made, Vol. 1, five singles were released: "Tupac Back" featuring Meek Mill and Rick Ross was released as the lead single on April 5, 2011. The song peaked at number 31 on the Hot R&B/Hip-Hop Songs and number 22 on the Rap Songs charts. "Pacman" featuring Ross and Pill was released two days later as the second single. On May 10, "By Any Means" was released as the third single, and features Ross, Mill, Wale and Pill. On May 17, "Fitted Cap" featuring Wale, Mill, Ross and J. Cole, and "Ima Boss" featuring Mill and Ross, were released as the fourth and fifth singles, respectively. "Ima Boss" peaked at number 51 on the Billboard Hot 100 in the US, number 20 on the Hot R&B/Hip-Hop Songs chart at number one on the Heatseekers Songs charts. The remix version of "Ima Boss", features T.I., Birdman, Lil Wayne, Ross, DJ Khaled and Swizz Beatz was released to iTunes on February 7, 2012.

After the album's release, the sixth single, "600 Benz" featuring Wale, Ross and Jadakiss was released on June 14, 2011. The song was produced by Cardiak. "That Way", the seventh single featuring Wale, Ross and Jeremih was released on August 30. "That Way" was produced by Lex Luger. The song peaked at number 49 on the Hot 100. The song also appears as the final track on Wale's second studio album, Ambition.

Critical reception

MMG Presents: Self Made, Vol. 1 has received generally favorable reviews from music critics. At Metacritic, which assigns a normalized rating out of 100 to reviews from mainstream critics, the album received an average score of 66, based on 7 reviews, which indicates "generally favorable".

Track listing

Personnel 
Credits for MMG Presents: Self Made, Vol. 1 adapted from Allmusic:

Olubowale Akintimehin – Composer
Young Shun – Producer
Beat Billionaire – Producer
Jahlil Beats – Producer
Jermaine Cole – Composer
Shamann Cooke – Composer
Eardrummers – Producer
Leigh Elliott – Composer
Jeremiah Felton – Composer
Danny Flam – Horn
Shante Franklin – Composer
Ricardo Gutierrez – Mastering
Antoine "Lil Lody" Kearney – Composer
Brent Kolatalo – Keyboards
Ken Lewis – Bass, Guitar
Lil Lody – Producer
Lee Major – Producer

Dallas Martin – A&R
Carl McCormick – Composer, Producer
Marquel Middlebrooks – Composer
Richard Morales Jr. – Composer
Teedra Moses – Composer
Jahlil Orlando – Composer
Keith Parry – Assistant Engineer
Ernest Price – Composer
Ernest Prince – Composer
Miguel "Che" – Composer
John Rivers – Mixing
Tyrone Rivers – Composer
William Roberts III – Composer, Executive Producer
Robert Williams – Composer
TaVon Sampson – Art Direction, Design
Ray Seay – Mixing
Smallz – Photography
Jason Smith – Composer
Justin Smith – Mastering
Justin Smith – Composer, Engineer, Mixing, Producer
Carlos Suarez – A&R

Adrian P. Taylor – Bass
Tone P – Producer
Roshun Walker – Composer
David-Andrew Wallach – Composer
Dylan Wissing – Drums
Andrew Wright – Engineer, Mixing
Young Guru – Mixing
Cydell Young – Composer
Danny Zook – Sample Clearance

Charts

Weekly charts

Year-end charts

References

2011 compilation albums
Rick Ross albums
Wale (rapper) compilation albums
Teedra Moses albums
Albums produced by Lex Luger
Albums produced by Just Blaze
Warner Records compilation albums
Record label compilation albums
Meek Mill albums
Maybach Music Group albums
Pill (rapper) compilation albums
Hip hop compilation albums
Albums produced by Mike Will Made It
Albums produced by Jahlil Beats
Albums produced by the Inkredibles
Albums produced by Cardiak